PVU  may refer to:

 Paradox Valley Unit, a pumping facility in the Paradox Valley in Colorado
 Paravur Railway Station, a railway station in Kollam, India
 , a university in Vietnam
 Porter Value Unit, a unit to measure proanthocyanidin content of a sample
 Potato virus U, a pathogenic plant virus discovered in Peru in 1983
 Potential vorticity unit, a unit in meteorology
 Provo Municipal Airport (IATA: PVU), Utah

See also
 PUV (disambiguation)